Edlesborough is a village and civil parish  in the Aylesbury Vale district of Buckinghamshire, England.
 
As well as the village of Edlesborough itself, the civil parish also includes the hamlets of Dagnall, Northall and part of Ringshall.  Hudnall was transferred in 1885 to the parish of Little Gaddesden in Hertfordshire.

Toponym
The village toponym is derived from the Old English for "Eadwulf's barrow". The Domesday Book of 1086 records it as Eddinberge.

Parish church

The Church of England parish church of St Mary the Virgin is built on top of a barrow and its high 14th-century bell tower is a local landmark. The church has been redundant since 1975, when the ecclesiastical parish merged with that of Eaton Bray. Today the church is in the care of the Churches Conservation Trust, and it is normally open to visitors.

The earliest parts of the church date from the 13th century. A chantry was added in 1338 and the tower in 1340. The closeness of these construction dates indicates how rich Edlesborough parish was at the time. Much of the church was altered in the 15th century, including the chantry, which has given the church a very 15th-century character.

Thomas Cobhambury appears as vicar of Edlisburgh in 1413.

On 28 March 1824, the tower was struck by lightning, setting it on fire. The roof's lead melted, and the molten lead set fire to everything it struck. Villagers fought the fire, which burned for 12 hours until it was extinguished.

Furnishings
The 15th-century rood screen, pulpit with tester and timber roofs are all notable. In the 15th century six misericords were added to the choir stalls. These include carvings of a bat, a dragon and a mermaid. The misericord of the dragon also has some frog carvings for its supporters. There are some notable monumental brasses.  The church underwent two major restorations overseen by the architect Robert Jewell Withers in 1867 and 1875.  
In the first restoration, box pews were replaced with pine benches, a gallery was removed from the west, the rood screen was painted, and a large wall painting was added to the nave wall by the Arts and Crafts artist Daniel Bell, depicting Christ enthroned in Majesty. The 1875 restoration of the chancel was funded by a donation from Adelbert Brownlow-Cust, 3rd Earl Brownlow of Ashridge.

A more modern addition is a two-light stained glass window on the theme of the Nativity by M. E. Aldrich Rope, also in  an Arts and Crafts style.

The Church contains six tuned bells, and one calling bell. It previously had only 5 tuned bells and one calling bell, however, another tuned bell was added after the fire in 1824. Since the Church was decommissioned, the bells no longer ring often, however, they are used during occasional special events.

Economic and social history
The Lower Icknield Way , a prehistoric track that runs below the Chiltern Escarpment, runs through the village and aligns with the church mound.

The village was once a centre for the straw plait industry. RAF Edlesborough was a radio station near Dagnall.

The nearby Edlesborough Hill is a low wooded hill beside the River Ouzel just south of the village . For decades it was the site of a Classic trials motor sport event known as the March Hare in which a variety of vehicles tried to climb the hill's steep ascent as a test of their capabilities.

St. Mary's Village Carnival
Annually, on the first Saturday in July, Edlesborough and the surrounding communities put on an annual carnival, held on the Village Green. It features several attractions, starting with a float parade in which several parties compete for a rosette. These parties include the local Scout group and Edlesborough Primary Academy, the village school, as well as other local scout groups and schools from the other villages surrounding Edlesborough. Other attractions include fairground rides, various shops, a classic vehicle display, barbeques and other food stalls, various performances by local performance groups, a dog show, and an owl display.

Carnival History
It didn't begin on the village's Green, as it does today. At first, it was a traditional Church fete, hosted in the Vicarage garden, before being moved to Park Farm in Eaton Bray in 1965. In 1988, it was moved once again to Eaton Bray Recreational Ground, however, the next year, it was moved to the Edlesborough Village Green. It was originally set to alternate between Eaton Bray Recreational Ground and Edlesborough Village Green, however, the former soon became too small to accommodate the growing event, and it now remains in Edlesborough.

Carnival Themes
Each year, the carnival chooses a different theme, and that theme is often reflected in the float parade.

2000: Around The World

2001: Wild West

2002: Celebrating Britain

2003: Circus

2004: Fantasy

2005: Nursery Rhymes

2006: Films

2007: Favourite Adverts

2008: Fairy Tales

2009: Books

2010: Inventions

2011: Pirates

2012: Kings and Queens

2013: Sci-Fi

2014: Music

2015: The Sea

2016: Myths, Monsters and Magic

2017: Transport

2018: Games

2019: Village Life

2020 (Cancelled): Heroes

2021: Heroes

2022: Love Our Planet

Carnival Trivia
- Pam Rhodes opened the 1998 Carnival.

- In 2020, during lockdown, instead of a carnival, a scarecrow competition was held, where people made scarecrows and put them on display around the village.

- In 2021, the carnival, while not cancelled, was delayed, instead taking place on the 28th of August.

Local Myths And Legends
- A legend says that a tunnel leads from the Church into a former pub, then known as The Bell when it was running. The pub has since been transformed into a private residence.

- While the aforementioned pub "The Bell" was still running, some witnesses claim that after hours, the ghost of a girl with a besom broom could be seen sweeping leaves from the floor by the fireplace. The first report of this sighting claimed that the apparition asked for a better broom.

- It is said that, on dark nights, riding on horseback down the road leading from the Church towards Tring Road, is the ghost of Dick Turpin. He was said to hide in the attic of Butler's Manor in Northall, looking out for coaches to come past for him to hold up.

Amenities
Edlesborough Primary Academy (Formerly Edlesborough School) is a community primary school. It serves the 4–11 age range and has about 250 pupils. The Academy was founded in 1849. The nearest secondary school is The Cottesloe School in Wing, though students that pass the Eleven-Plus exams can also choose to enrol in one of the three Grammar Schools in the relatively nearby town of Aylesbury, the three Grammar Schools being Aylesbury Grammar School, Aylesbury High School, and Sir Henry Floyd Grammar School.

The village green has two football pitches, one enclosed tennis court and a cricket square. There is a small playing area for children in the green, as well as another in The Grange, which is a residential development further out in the village. There is also a sports pavilion next to the tennis court, which was upgraded in 2021 to include a gym and a café. Nearby, the more central area of the village contains the Edlesborough Post Office and Stores, a corner shop that sells general food supplies and birthday cards, as well as serving as a post office. Next to the shop is an appliance retail, Janes LTD, and the Heirloom Café.

The village is also home to a village pub, the Traveler's Rest, and a used car dealer, the NMJ Motorhouse.

Talk Talk
The English band Talk Talk filmed a music video for their song "Dum Dum Girl" on their 1984 album It's My Life. The video was filmed on Sparrow Hill Farm; the parish church can be seen in the background. It does not seem that the music video was ever released officially.

References

Sources

External links

Civil parishes in Buckinghamshire
Villages in Buckinghamshire
Grade I listed churches in Buckinghamshire